The 1954 Scottish League Cup final was played on 23 October 1954, at Hampden Park in Glasgow and was the final of the 9th Scottish League Cup competition. The final was contested by Heart of Midlothian and Motherwell. Hearts won the match 4–2, mainly thanks to a hat-trick by Willie Bauld.

Match details

References

External links
 Soccerbase

1954
League Cup final
Heart of Midlothian F.C. matches
Motherwell F.C. matches
1950s in Glasgow